BMS Scuderia Italia SpA (sometimes referred to as simply Scuderia Italia) is an Italian auto racing team founded by Italian steel magnate and motorsports enthusiast Giuseppe Lucchini in 1983.

Scuderia Italia has been involved with many automobile manufacturers, including Alfa Romeo, Lancia, Ferrari, Nissan, Porsche, and Aston Martin.  The team competed in the FIA GT Championship with a pair of Ferrari F430s, while their Brixia Racing arm competed in the FIA GT3 European Championship and Italian GT Championship with Aston Martin DBRS9's.

Team history

Brixia Motor Sport
In 1983, after being involved with Osella, Giorgio Francia, and Mirabella Racing's efforts in the Italian Group 6 Championship and later the World Endurance Championship, Giuseppe Lucchini decided to form his own team.  Named after the original Latin name for the team's base of Brescia, Brixia Motor Sport campaigned an Alfa Romeo GTV6 in the Italian Rally Championship before replacing it with a Lancia 037 in 1985.  Brixia returned to Alfa Romeo in 1987 as the team expanded to enter the new Alfa Romeo 75 in both the World Touring Car Championship and the Italian Rally Championship.  Alfa Romeo however chose to withdraw from the World Touring Car Championship, and Lucchini turned his attention to another World Championship.

Formula One

Dallara era
After abandoning the World Touring Car Championship during the 1987 season, Giuseppe Lucchini set his sights on entering the Formula One World Championship in the coming year.  Unable to construct their own car, Lucchini brokered a deal with Dallara owner Gian Paolo Dallara to construct a new car based on their experience as a Formula 3000 entry.  Lucchini renamed his team BMS Scuderia Italia (with Dallara being the listed constructor for the purposes of the World Constructors' Championship standings) and placed Vittorio Palazzani in charge of the new entry. Sergio Rinland designed the new Dallara 188 and also served as the team's chief engineer. Cosworth provided their Ford DFZ V8 and Italian Alex Caffi was signed to drive the team's sole entry. The car was late being completed, forcing the team to bring a Dallara Formula 3000 car to the first meeting in Brazil. The team was unable to score any points, but qualified for fourteen of sixteen races during the year. Caffi earned a best finish of seventh at the Portuguese Grand Prix, one position outside of the points.

The team's new Dallara 189s were designed by new engineer Mario Tolentino. At the third race of the year, the Monaco Grand Prix, Caffi earned the team's first points finish when he came home in fourth, although the Constructors' Championship recognized Dallara rather than Scuderia Italia. Later that season, aided by heavy attrition at the Canadian Grand Prix, both drivers earned points. De Cesaris earned the team's first podium as well by finishing in third place, while Caffi was two laps behind in sixth. For the rest of the year, however, the two were unable to score any more points, although Caffi qualified an outstanding third in the Hungarian Grand Prix and both cars qualified in the top 10 in the season-ending Australian Grand Prix. De Cesaris and Caffi were thus ranked 17th in the Drivers' Championship, while the combined total of eight points earned Dallara eighth in the Constructors' Championship.

In , team manager Patrizio Cantù departed the team and was replaced by former Ferrari engineer Pierpaolo Gardella.  Alex Caffi also left the team, moving to Arrows. Emanuele Pirro was signed as his replacement, although Gianni Morbidelli was substituted in the first two races of the season when Pirro was unwell. The team struggled throughout the year, unable to earn points in any races (although de Cesaris started 3rd in the season-opening United States Grand Prix) and only able to reach the finish in seven of the sixteen Grands Prix, although one of these finishes (de Cesaris in France) was later disqualified.

De Cesaris also needed replacing, as he had signed to drive for the brand new Jordan team. Finn Jyrki Järvilehto, otherwise known as JJ Lehto, was signed and quickly gained BMS Scuderia Italia their first points since 1989, earning a third-place finish at the San Marino Grand Prix. Pirro followed this with sixth place at the Monaco Grand Prix and his first point for the team. However, Lehto failed to finish more than half of the races during the year and Pirro struggled to prequalify for several races (but only in the first half of the season due to the 1990 disaster), and so the two were ranked twelfth and eighteenth respectively in the Drivers' Championship. Dallara once again earned eighth in the Constructors' Championship.

Giuseppe Lucchini was able to negotiate the use of year-old Ferrari V12 engines for the  season and gained Pierluigi Martini as a replacement for Pirro who had been released by the team.  Reliability increased as the team managed to complete all but four Grands Prix with at least one car.  Martini scored the team's only points of the year with two consecutive sixth-place finishes at the Spanish Grand Prix and San Marino Grand Prix, earning him sixteenth in the Drivers' Championship and Dallara tenth in the Constructors' Championship.

Lola era

Giuseppe Lucchini announced that – after friction between Dallara and Ferrari – the cars for  would be constructed by Lola Cars of Britain, with Ferrari remaining as the engine supplier. (Lola and Larrousse had some success in 1990, but had parted at the end of 1991 as Larrousse was running into problems.) Following the announcement of leaving Dallara, the drivers Lehto and Martini moved to new teams. The team gained a sponsorship deal from Chesterfield cigarettes, and Lucchini signed Michele Alboreto and rookie Luca Badoer as drivers. As with the Dallara era, Lola was the listed constructor in the championship standings.

The team's switch to the newer Lola, however, did not improve their results, as Alboreto and Badoer struggled to qualify for several races. Badoer had the team's best finish of the year at the San Marino Grand Prix with a seventh place (ensuring the team finished ahead of Tyrrell Racing, whose best finish was Ukyo Katayama's tenth place finish at Hungaroring), but by the final races of the season the team was struggling for money and chose to withdraw from the last two events, having earned no points all season. The team did however attend the 1993 Formula One Indoor Trophy, but were eliminated in the semi-finals.

At the end of the 1993 season Minardi was also struggling for money, and Giancarlo Minardi and Giuseppe Lucchini decided to merge their teams in order to continue into the  season.  The merged team returned to earning points in 1994 as well as  before Lucchini chose to exit the venture in order to concentrate BMS Scuderia Italia on other programs.

Return to touring cars
When Giuseppe Lucchini's Formula One program came to an end in 1993, the team attempted to return to the smaller racing championships from which they had started. Nissan approached BMS Scuderia Italia to campaign the company's Primeras in the new German Super Tourenwagen Cup which was announced for 1994. German Michael Bartels and Italian Ivan Capelli were hired and completed the season sixth and eleventh in the drivers' championship. The team expanded to three cars in 1995, with Capelli joined by Sascha Maassen and Kieth O'Dor. O'Dor won the team's only race of the season at AVUS and finished tenth in the drivers' championship; however, he was killed in a collision during the second race at AVUS that weekend.

Anthony Reid replaced O'Dor on the squad in 1996, but the team chose not to run the full season with all cars. Maassen led the team in the drivers' championship by finishing sixteenth, but by then Giuseppe Lucchini had decided to move out of the Super Tourenwagen Cup, leaving Nissan to move to Team Rosberg. BMS Scuderia Italia made a brief return to touring car racing in 1998 when they entered a pair of Alfa Romeo 155s for Christian Pescatori and Emanuele Moncini in the Italian Superturismo Championship, but withdrew once more the following season.

Sportscar success

1997–2001
After the departure from the Super Tourenwagen Cup, Giuseppe Lucchini became one of the first customers of Porsche's new racing car, the 911 GT1.  One of the team's former Formula One drivers, Pierluigi Martini, returned to the company and shared the new car with Christian Pescatori in the brand new FIA GT Championship for 1997.  The duo scored a best finish of sixth at Helsinki, earning them a single point to tie for ninth in the Teams Championship.  BMS Scuderia Italia also entered the 24 Hours of Le Mans for the first time with the 911 GT1, Brazilian Antônio Hermann de Azevedo joining Martini and Pescatori.  The team finished in eighth place overall and fourth in their class.

In 1999, the company returned to sports car racing, this time purchasing a pair of Ferrari 333 SP sports prototype for use in the Sports Racing World Cup. Pescatori and Moncini were retained from the team's Italian Superturismo entry the previous year, while father and son, Angelo and Marco Zadra shared the second entry. Pescatori and Moncini scored a win at the Autodromo di Pergusa, eventually finishing third and fourth respectively in the drivers' championship. The team earned second in the Teams Championship, fourteen points shy of JB Racing.

For the 2000 season, Austrian Philipp Peter and Swiss Lilian Bryner and Enzo Calderari joined the two Zadras in the Ferraris. A class win was earned by Bryner, Calderari, and Angelo Zadra at the Circuit de Spa-Francorchamps, although they did not win the race overall. The team finished the season second in the Teams Championship once again, while Marco Zadra and Philipp Peter tied for third in the drivers' championship. Christian Pescatori briefly returned to the squad at the start of the 2001 season of what was now known as the FIA Sportscar Championship, winning alongside Marco Zadra in the first race of the year. Pescatori was eventually replaced by Jean-Marc Gounon, who also earned a victory for the team.  BMS Scuderia Italia was able to secure the Teams Championship by a margin of 22 points, while Marco Zadra also won the Drivers' Championship.

2002–2005
With the 333 SP outdated, BMS Scuderia Italia returned to the FIA GT Championship, continuing to campaign for Ferrari by racing two Prodrive-built Ferrari 550 Maranellos in the series.  Andrea Piccini and Jean-Denis Délétraz shared the team's primary car, while the other car featured Lilian Bryner, Enzo Calderari, and Frédéric Dor, who was eventually replaced by Jean-Marc Gounon.  After only three races, Piccini and Délétraz began a streak of consecutive victories, winning at Jarama, Anderstorp, and Oschersleben.  A further fourth victory ended the year at Estoril.  Even with four race victories, multiple races without points hurt the team and they were scored fourth in the Teams Championship.  Piccini and Délétraz shared third in the drivers' championship.

Under the guidance of new Technical Director Marco Gadola, the team expanded greatly in 2003 as a third car was added to their effort, running under the Care Racing banner.  The team's driver pairings included Matteo Bobbi and Thomas Biagi, Fabrizio Gollin and Luca Cappellari, and Bryner and Calderari sharing the Care entry with Stefano Livio.  The team opened the year on top by finishing first, second, and third at their first race.  Bobbi and Biagi dominated the field by winning the next four races in a row, followed by a class win and second overall at the Spa 24 Hours for Gollin, Cappellari, Bryner, and Calderari.  Two more wins were earned in the remaining events of the season, giving the team a total of eight victories in ten races, not only earning the Teams Championship for BMS Scuderia Italia, but also third for the Care Racing banner as well. Bobbi and Biagi shared the drivers' championship, Gollin and Cappellari second in the championship, and Bryner and Calderari third.

The three Ferraris returned to defend their Championships in 2004, retaining much of their driver lineup. Gabriele Gardel was the only replacement, taking over from Thomas Biagi as Bobbi's co-driver. The year started well for BMS Scuderia Italia once more as Gollin and Cappellari earned two consecutive victories, while Gardel and Bobbi earned their first at the fourth round of the season. The team also improved on their previous result at the Spa 24 Hours, winning the race overall with Gollin and Cappellari sharing with Bryner and Calderari. Lilian Bryner was therefore the first female driver ever to win an international 24 hours event. The team finished the season with five total victories, winning their second Teams Championship, while Gollin and Cappellari earned the drivers' championship that year.

Although BMS Scuderia Italia was the defending two-time FIA GT Champion, Giuseppe Lucchini decided to switch series in order to concentrate on endurance racing.  Two of the team's Ferraris were entered in the new Le Mans Endurance Series as well as the national Italian GT Championship. Christian Pescatori returned to the team, joined by newcomers Michele Bartyan, Toni Seiler, Matteo Cressoni, and Miguel Ramos.  The Gollin, Cressoni, and Ramos trio won the opening Le Mans race of the year while Pescatori, Bartyan, and Seiler won two of the remaining four events.  In Italian GT, the team won five of the seven races over the year, as well as two races in the GT2 class with a Ferrari 360 Modena GTC run in partnership with Racing Team Edil Cris.  Teams Championships were secured in both Le Mans and Italian GT's GT1 classes, earning the squad their third consecutive victorious year with the Ferrari 550.  The two 550s were also entered in the 24 Hours of Le Mans for the second time in the team's history.  Both however failed to finish the race, retiring early.

2006–2007
After the team's success with Prodrive's customer version of the Ferrari 550, BMS Scuderia Italia was one of two teams selected by Prodrive to become a factory-backed entry for Aston Martin and their new DBR9 race car.  Prodrive's own team was concentrating on the 24 Hours of Le Mans, while Larbre Compétition was tasked with competing in the Le Mans Series.  This left BMS Scuderia Italia, now running under the Aston Martin Racing BMS banner, to return to the FIA GT Championship as Aston Martin's representative.  Former FIA GT champion Fabrizio Gollin was partnered with Fabio Babini, while former Le Mans Series champions Pescatori and Ramos shared the second Aston Martin.  A trio of new Aston Martin DBRS9s were also entered by the team in the new FIA GT3 European Championship for amateur drivers.

The squad however did not return to the FIA GT Championship in the same fashion in which they had left it in 2004. The team was unable to score any victories, and in fact was unable to finish any better than third on multiple occasions. However, even though the team lacked victories, they were able to consistently score points, enough to finish second in the teams' championship. Fabio Babini was the team's highest scoring driving, earning ninth in the drivers' championship. The team's 24 Hours of Le Mans entry was also short-lived as their lone Aston Martin crashed heavily after only three laps.  BMS Scuderia Italia's FIA GT3 effort earned a single win for fourth place in the teams' championship.

For the 2007 season, BMS Scuderia Italia remained Aston Martin's primary team in the FIA GT Championship, but the team also purchased a Porsche 997 GT3-RSR for the series' lower GT2 class. Porsche factory driver Emmanuel Collard drove alongside Matteo Malucelli, earning a class win at the Spa 24 Hours and finishing the season second in the GT2 Teams Championship.  The primary GT1 team however struggled throughout the year, earning no victories and earning sixth in the Teams Championship.  The team's DBR9 however was able to have a strong performance at the 24 Hours of Le Mans by finishing eleventh overall and sixth in GT1.  In FIA GT3, the DBRS9 won the final event of the year and the team secured third place in the Teams Championship.

Following the 2007 season, Aston Martin and Prodrive's changing efforts in GT1 led BMS Scuderia Italia to end their partnership as a factory team.  However, BMS Scuderia Italia's private efforts with Aston Martins in the FIA GT3 European Championship remain as the team has resurrected the Brixia Racing name.  Drivers Marcello Zani and Matteo Malucelli founded the team to concentrate solely on not just the FIA GT3 series, but also the smaller national Italian GT Championship with the company's Aston Martin DBRS9s.

In FIA GT, BMS Scuderia Italia has moved on from both Aston Martin and Porsche, as the team purchased two Ferrari F430s for the GT2 Championship.  Paolo Ruberti and Matteo Malucelli share the team's #77 entry, while Davide Rigon is partnered with Joël Camathias in the #78.  The team also entered one of their Ferraris in the 2008 and 2009 24 Hours of Le Mans races finishing second in the GT2 class in both those years' races, aided by the return of Fabio Babini.

Results summary

Complete Formula One results

(key) (results in bold indicate pole position)

References

External links

 BMS Scuderia Italia
 BMS Scuderia Italia Historic Team

Italian auto racing teams
Formula One entrants
24 Hours of Le Mans teams
European Le Mans Series teams
FIA GT Championship teams
FIA Sportscar Championship entrants
World Touring Car Championship teams
Formula Renault teams
Auto racing teams established in 1983
Italian Formula 3 teams